During the 2001–02 English football season, Ipswich Town competed in the FA Premier League.

Season summary
A year after finishing fifth in the Premiership and earning George Burley the title of "Manager of the Year", Ipswich dropped back into Division One after two years among the elite after falling victim to second season syndrome. A dismal start to the season saw their UEFA Cup dream end in the third phase of the competition, while after 18 games they were still bottom of the Premiership with just one win. A turnaround then followed and seven wins from eight games pulled Ipswich up to 12th and appeared to have secured their survival. But another slump set in and this time they were unable to halt it. Any lingering hopes of survival were ended on the final day by a 5–0 defeat against Liverpool.

Despite losing their Premiership status, the Tractor Boys still had European action to look forward to. They attained UEFA Cup qualification via the UEFA Respect Fair Play ranking.

First-team squad
Squad at end of season

Left club during season

Reserve squad
The following players were contracted to Ipswich, but did not make any competitive appearances that season.

Pre-season
Ipswich's pre-season in 2001 included two pre-season tours, the first being a tour of Scandinavia in July. The second tour took place in the Republic of Ireland in August.

Legend

Competitions

FA Premier League

League table
16. Ipswich 45 pts

17. Derby country 41 pts

Results by round

Legend

Ipswich Town's score comes first

Matches

FA Cup

League Cup

UEFA Cup

Transfers

Transfers in

Loans in

Transfers out

Loans out

Transfers in:  £13,750,000
Transfers out:  £9,000,000
Total spending:  £4,750,000

Squad statistics
All statistics updated as of end of season

Appearances and goals

|-
! colspan=14 style=background:#dcdcdc; text-align:center| Goalkeepers

|-
! colspan=14 style=background:#dcdcdc; text-align:center| Defenders

|-
! colspan=14 style=background:#dcdcdc; text-align:center| Midfielders

|-
! colspan=14 style=background:#dcdcdc; text-align:center| Forwards

|-

Goalscorers

Clean sheets

Disciplinary record

Starting 11
Considering starts in all competitions

Awards

Player awards

Premier League Player of the Month

References

Ipswich Town F.C. seasons
Ipswich Town